Snowdrops and Aces is a 1983 Czech comedy film about a group of high school students learning to ski in the mountains. It was filmed with students from the Gymnázium Nad Štolou high school in Prague.

See also
 Sněženky a machři po 25 letech, a 2008 sequel

External links
 
 Snowdrops and Aces on the Czechoslovak Film Database
 Snowdrops and Aces on Kinobox.cz

1983 films
Czechoslovak comedy films
1983 comedy films
1980s coming-of-age comedy films
Czech coming-of-age comedy films
Films directed by Karel Smyczek
1980s Czech films